

Belgium
 Belgian Congo – Martin Rutten, Governor-General of the Belgian Congo (1923–1927)

France
 French Somaliland –
 Jules Gérard Auguste Lauret, Governor of French Somaliland (1918–1924)
 Pierre Aimable Chapon-Baissac, Governor of French Somaliland (1924–1932)
 Guinea – Jean Louis Georges Poiret, Lieutenant-Governor of Guinea (1922–1925)

Japan
 Karafuto –
Nagai Kinjirō, Governor-General of Karafuto (17 April 1919 – 11 June 1924)
Masaya Akira, Governor-General of Karafuto (11 June 1924 – 5 August 1926)
 Korea – Saitō Makoto, Governor-General of Korea (1919–1927)
 Taiwan –
Uchida Kakichi, Governor-General of Taiwan (6 September 1923 – September 1924)
Takio Izawa, Governor-General of Taiwan (1 September 1924 – July 1926)

Portugal
 Angola –
 João Mendes Ribeiro Norton de Matos, High Commissioner of Angola (1921–1924)
 João Augusto Crispiniano Soares, High Commissioner of Angola (1924)
 Antero Tavares de Carvalho, High Commissioner of Angola (1924–1925)

United Kingdom
 Malta Colony
Herbert Plumer, Governor of Malta (1919–1924)
Walter Congreve, Governor of Malta (1924–1927)
 Northern Rhodesia
 Richard Goode, acting Administrator of Northern Rhodesia (1923–1924)
 Sir Herbert Stanley, Governor of Northern Rhodesia (1924–1927)

Notes

Colonial governors
Colonial governors
1924